Akhtehchi may refer to:
 Akhtehchi, Hamadan
 Akhtehchi, Mazandaran